The Movement for Socialism (Spanish: Movimiento Al Socialismo, MAS) was a Trotskyist political party in Argentina. It was founded in 1982 and led by Nahuel Moreno until his death, in 1987.

Under the name Nuevo MAS (New MAS) it stood in the 2009 Argentine legislative election in an alliance with the Socialist Workers' Party and Socialist Left.

References

External links
 Official website

1982 establishments in Argentina
Communist parties in Argentina
Political parties established in 1982
Trotskyist organisations in Argentina